Robert Farmer (born March 4, 1974) is a former American football running back in the National Football League who played for the New York Jets. He played college football for the Notre Dame Fighting Irish.

References

1974 births
Living people
American football running backs
New York Jets players
Notre Dame Fighting Irish football players